The Sheshan Basilica, officially the National Shrine and Minor Basilica of Our Lady of Sheshan and also known as Basilica of Mary, Help of Christians is a prominent Roman Catholic church in Shanghai. Its common name comes from its location on the western peak of Sheshan Hill, located in Songjiang District, to the west of Shanghai's metropolitan area.
 
Pope Pius XII raised the Sheshan church to the rank of minor basilica via his pontifical decree “Compertum Habemus” on 12 September 1942. The shrine was previously romanized as Zosè Basilica (pronounced "Zoh-seh"), using the Shanghainese pronunciation of "" (Sheshan). A venerated statue of the Blessed Virgin Mary under the title of Mary Help of Christians is enshrined within as the patroness of the basilica, along with the recently reconstructed icon of Our Mother of Sheshan, both venerated by Chinese Catholics.

History 
The first church on Sheshan hill was built in 1863. During the Taiping Rebellion, Jesuit missionaries bought a plot of land on the southern slopes of the hill. A derelict Buddhist monastery had stood on the site. The remaining buildings were demolished, and a small building was constructed as living quarters for missionaries, and a small chapel. At the peak of the hill (where the Maitreya hall had stood), a small pavilion was built in which was placed a statue of the Madonna.

In June 1870, unrest in Tianjin led to the burning of churches there. The Shanghai Jesuits prayed at the statue of the Madonna and pledged to build a church to her honor in return for her protection. Subsequently, construction of a church designed by the French Jesuit brother Léon Mariot (馬历耀 Ma Liyao, 1830–1902) began in 1871. Wood was shipped in from Shanghai, and stone bought from Fujian. All material had to be ported to the peak by hand. The church was completed two years later. This first church was in the form of a cross, and incorporated features of both Chinese and Western architecture. A veranda was placed outside the door, with ten columns. Eight stone lions were placed before the church. In 1894, several ancillary buildings were added. These included the mid-level church, a shrine to the Sacred Heart, the Virgin Mary, and St. Joseph. Fourteen Stations of the Cross were constructed along the path to the church. In 1899–1901, the French Jesuits built an astronomical observatory on the top of the hill, which included a telescope bought by father Stanislas Chevalier (蔡尚質 Cai Shangzhi, 1852–1930) in France.

In 1920, the existing church was found to be inadequate, and it lagged far behind other churches in Shanghai in terms of size and ornamentation. The Shanghai Jesuits asked the Belgian missionary-architect father Alphonse De Moerloose (和羹柏 He Gengbo, 1858–1932) to design the plans for a monumental new basilica. After the demolition of the old church in 1923, the new basilica on top of the hill was slowly built from 1924 to 1935, under the daily supervision of the Portuguese Jesuit missionary-architect father François-Xavier Diniz (葉肇昌 Ye Zhaochang, 1869–1943).

On June 14, 1924, in the context of the Catholic Synod of Shanghai, archbishop Celso Costantini and twenty-five members of the synod climbed on Sheshan hill and solemnly consecrated China to the Virgin Mary.

Pope Pius XII formally raised the Sheshan church to the rank of minor basilica via his pontifical decree “Compertum Habemus” (originally written on 24 July 1942) and was officially signed and notarized on 12 September 1942.

Peter Harmsen ('Shanghai 1937 – Stalingrad on the Yangtse') gives an account of the battle around the basilica during the Chinese retreat from Shanghai.

During the Cultural Revolution, Sheshan basilica was severely damaged. The stained-glass windows of the church, carvings along the Via Dolorosa, the statue atop the bell tower, and various other works of iconography were destroyed.

In the 1950s, Ignatius Kung Pin-Mei, the Roman Catholic bishop of Shanghai, was arrested and imprisoned for over 30 years, and the Chinese government put the basilica under the control of the Catholic Patriotic Association and Chinese bishops not recognized by the Vatican and condemned by the papal encyclical Ad Apostolorum principis.

After the end of the Cultural Revolution in 1976, the damage was gradually repaired. The statue was initially replaced with a simple iron

cross, and a replacement statue was installed in 2000.

Pope Benedict XVI on 24 May 2008 announced that he had composed a special prayer for Our Lady of Sheshan.

Layout
The church occupies an area of 1 hectare and is about 70 feet (20 m) tall. It is a rectangular Latin cross in shape, and in classical basilica form. Entrances are placed in the north, west, and south. The main door is in the southwest. The nave is 55.81 m long, 24.68 m wide. The ceiling is 16.46 m high, and the church can seat 3000. The altar is placed at the eastern end, and is built of marble with gold trim and in-laid jade. The exterior is mainly granite, and part of the roof is covered in Chinese-style color-glazed tiles.

The bell tower stands on the south-east corner. It is 38 m tall. At the top of its bell tower stands a 4.8m bronze Madonna and Child statue ("Our Lady of Zosè").

Other features
The Stations of the Cross are situated at the end of each zig-zag path up the steep hill leading to the church. At the mid-level in an open square where there are two shrines, one in devotion to the Sacred Heart and the other to the Virgin Mary.

Nearby is the Sheshan Observatory (now Sheshan Station of the Shanghai Astronomical Observatory). It was originally built by the Jesuits.

Pilgrimage
In 1874, Pope Pius IX declared that pilgrims who went to Sheshan in May (traditionally a Marian month) would receive a plenary indulgence. As a result, pilgrims from all over China began to congregate at Sheshan in May, a practice that continues to this day.

Every May, the church becomes the destination for pilgrims who travel far and wide to make their annual pilgrimage at Sheshan, praying the Way of the Cross, the Rosary and attending Mass at this holy site. Traditionally, many of the Catholics in the area were fishermen, who would make the pilgrimage by boat. This tradition continues among local Catholics, with the result that the creeks around Sheshan are often crowded with boats in May.

See also
 Roman Catholic Marian churches

References

External links

Thomas Coomans, « Notre-Dame de Sheshan à Shanghai, basilique des jésuites français en Chine », Bulletin monumental, 2018, 176/2, p. 129–156 .
"Our Lady of Sheshan" on the website of the Cardinal Kung Foundation
"Prayer of His Holiness Benedict XVI to Our Lady of Sheshan on the occasion of the World Day of Prayer for the Church in China" on the website of the Vatican

Roman Catholic churches in Shanghai
Landmarks in Shanghai
Tourist attractions in Shanghai
Roman Catholic shrines in China
Basilica churches in China